Faydiya, or Al Fa'idiyah is a town in the District of Jebel el-Akhdar in northeastern Libya.

References

Populated places in Jabal al Akhdar